Dornbach may refer to:
 Maximilian Dörnbach (born 1995), German track cyclist
 Dornbach (Eschbach), a river of Hesse, Germany, tributary of the Eschbach
 Dörnbach (Rockenhausen), a part of the town Rockenhausen, Rhineland-Palatinate, Germany
 Dornbach (Vienna), a part of the Vienna district Hernals, Austria